The Tiwi people (or Tunuvivi) are one of the many Aboriginal groups of Australia. The Tiwi language is a language isolate, with no apparent link to the languages of Arnhem Land on the Australian mainland. Their society is based on matrilineal descent, and marriage plays a very important part in many aspects of their lives. Art and music form an intrinsic part of their societal and spiritual rituals. The Stolen Generations saw many Indigenous people brought to the Tiwi Islands who were not of direct Tiwi descent.

Language
Tiwi, the most polysynthetic of all Australian languages, is a language isolate with no apparent genetic link to the contiguous languages of Arnhem Land on the Australian mainland.

Country and history

There are two large inhabited islands, Melville and Bathurst, originally called Ratuwati Yinjara (meaning "two islands"), and many smaller uninhabited islands. The Tiwi Islands are now part of the Northern Territory of Australia.

Dutch explorers landed on Melville Island in 1705, but did not colonise it then nor in succeeding voyages. After a failed attempt by the British in 1824, it was not settled by Europeans until the arrival of German missionaries in 1911. The Stolen Generations saw many Indigenous people brought to the Tiwi Islands who were not of direct Tiwi descent.

Kinship
The Tiwi come from a matrilineal descent group, which the Tiwi call "skin". This group of "skin" believe pregnancy comes from spirits. The Tiwi believe these spirits are unborn, coming from bodies of water. This traditional belief system from the Tiwi explains how the man has no physical role in birth, but a male's role is to find a spirit and uncover it, so that it is sent to the wife. The kin clan must be the same for the spirit as the wife. All Tiwi members have a general kinship to each other. This is separated into "close" and "far away" kinship which refers to the distance geographically between the Tiwi people. A band unit which is smaller only rely on somebodies sex or marriage. This means people such as mother, father, or husband are considered your close kin. Smaller units of bands that are dependent through one sex or one marriage only. Any person within this emblem are considered your close kin: Like mother, father, sister, & brother. With this said, acceptance into Tiwi society is often very loose, with traditional Tiwi members naming newcomers in the society as "son" and "daughter." This is known as a "far away" kinship where other races were often still considered as outsiders to traditional Tiwi people.

Marriage
Marriage roles of the Tiwi plays an important role for economic, social and political status. The Tiwi consider marriage as a very important aspect of their livelihoods, as almost all people get married, especially women. Tiwi culture places great emphasis on the importance of marriage in women's lives. Since both the men and women come from a matrilineal descent group, wives descent group is important. Remarriage of a widow is common for the traditional Tiwi, which allows the less promising hunters to be married. This is because widows have to remarry quickly, which had to be immediately after the husband dies. A marriage occurs at a gravesite of the previous husband. Since the more promising husbands are usually claimed, older women often end up with younger, less experienced men. Bestowal is often used in the Tiwi culture, which is the main way of receiving young wives. Successful men, usually older men often had many wives, even up to 20 for very promising husbands. Men younger than 30 often had fewer or no wives. In traditional Tiwi culture, ages 30–40 were the most likely to be married to widows. Older women had great importance in the society, mainly because the necessity of food in Tiwi society. The older woman know all the gathering skills, making food not be a problem for the household. On the other hand, less experienced woman created problems for the household, as they have less food. Younger women often were like apprentices, learning all the possible ways of gathering from older women to please their husband or household. Even though this traditional marriage culture is still very prevalent in modern Tiwi culture, marriage has changed juristically recently because of Catholic missionaries beginning to settle on Tiwi land after the 1945. According to culture sketches, the power dynamic of men and women both had their advantages. While men had a lot more political power, women were well respected for their gathering skills to provide food and favors.

Hunting for food is still an important part of Tiwi life. On land, they hunt for wallaby, lizards, possums, carpet snakes, pig, buffalo, flying foxes, bandicoot, turtle and seagull eggs and magpie geese. From the sea they hunt for turtle, crocodiles, dugong and fish.

Dancing or yoi as they call it, is a part of everyday life. Tiwi inherit their totemic dance, evocative of the dreamtime and which defines their spiritual identity from their father. Narrative dances are performed to depict everyday life or historical events. The land on both islands is heavily forested.

Art, music and ritual

Art 
Compared with Arnhem Land art, Tiwi art often appears to be abstract and geometric. With its strong patterns and use of colour, Tiwi art is considered very attractive and highly collectible. Tiwi art is used to tell stories, and the hatch patterns represent friendships within the community. Many art experts worldwide have studied Tiwi art and have analysed the meaning of Tiwi symbols. Tiwi art forms an integral part of the oral tradition passing on history and wisdom through generations.
English is taught at schools as a second language, and the Tiwi communicate principally in their own language. When in mourning, it is part of their beliefs to paint their body and express their love for who has passed through music, art and dance. Painting has been practised for thousands of years as a part of ceremonies and the Tiwi totem poles are famous and have been sold all over the world. Tiwi use natural ochre pigments. They make these colours from natural pigment in the earth. When a person dies their name becomes taboo. For many years as the spirit returns to the land, you cannot say the name of the person. When the Tiwis are using their remarkable knowledge to find food in the bush, they never take the mothers or the baby animals. This proves their incredible respect for the land and knowledge of how to conserve the environment.

Music 
Music has formed an integral part, of all aspects of life on the Tiwi islands, being centered around the Tiwi initiation ceremony, kulama (yam), and the innovative use of song on such occasions is now at risk given the weakening of the customary rituals that engendered its creativity.

The Tiwi people sing songs about the land which have been handed down through the generations. They sing about many aspects of their lives, including hunting, cooking, family, animals, plants and the Australian outback. Some of these songs have been recorded and archived. There was a performance of Tiwi women singing recently in different important venues in Australia. The Tiwi "strong women's group" are currently working on a collaborative project to conserve their music. Research has led to a revival of some of the old songs. As these songs have been sung for thousands of years, it is with the strictest sensitivity that this research must be carried out.

The music of the Tiwi women "strong women's group" is being preserved and revived currently on Bathurst and Melville island.

Notable people
 David Kantilla
 Austin Wonaeamirri
 Cyril Rioli
 Anthony McDonald-Tipungwuti

Notes

Citations

Sources

 
Aboriginal peoples of the Northern Territory